The 1st Cabinet of North Korea was elected by the 1st Session of the 1st Supreme People's Assembly on 9 September 1948. It was replaced on 20 September 1957 by the 2nd Cabinet.

Members

References

Citations

Bibliography
Books:
 

1st Supreme People's Assembly
Cabinet of North Korea
1948 establishments in North Korea
1957 disestablishments in North Korea